Withnell railway station was a railway station that served Abbey Village and Withnell, in Lancashire, England.

History
The station was opened by the Lancashire and Yorkshire Railway. It was on the Blackburn to Chorley Line. In January 1960, the station was closed following the withdrawal of the Wigan–Chorley–Blackburn passenger service.  Goods traffic continued to pass through the station until 1966, when the line closed completely. The area where the track once was is now a public footpath, and there is a nature reserve on the track bed.

Services

References

Disused railway stations in Chorley
Former Lancashire Union Railway stations
Railway stations in Great Britain closed in 1960
Railway stations in Great Britain opened in 1869